Lennart Grill (born 25 January 1999) is a German professional footballer who plays as a goalkeeper for Bundesliga club Union Berlin, on loan from Bayer Leverkusen.

Club career
In January 2019, 1. FC Kaiserslautern manager Sascha Hildmann confirmed that Grill would be the starting goalkeeper for the club over Wolfgang Hesl in the second half of the 2018–19 season. He made his debut for Kaiserslautern in the 3. Liga on 26 January 2019, starting in the home match against Sonnenhof Großaspach, which finished as a 2–0 win.

Bayer Leverkusen
On 8 March 2019, it was announced that Grill would sign for Bayer Leverkusen starting from the 2020–21 Bundesliga season on a four-year deal. Grill made his debut for the team on 28 February 2021, by playing the full 90-minutes in a 1–2 home loss to SC Freiburg, when Lukáš Hrádecký continues to recover from the achilles tendon problems.

Union Berlin 
On 16 June 2022, Grill moved to Union Berlin on a loan agreement, with Union reserving an option to buy.

International career
Grill was included in Germany's squad for the 2016 UEFA European Under-17 Championship in Azerbaijan. The team managed to reach the semi-finals, before losing 1–2 against Spain. Grill made his only appearance of the tournament in the match against Spain, coming on as a substitute in the 80th minute following a red card for starting goalkeeper Jan-Christoph Bartels.

References

External links

1999 births
Living people
People from Birkenfeld (district)
Footballers from Rhineland-Palatinate
German footballers
Germany youth international footballers
Association football goalkeepers
1. FC Kaiserslautern II players
1. FC Kaiserslautern players
Bayer 04 Leverkusen players
SK Brann players
Bundesliga players
3. Liga players
Regionalliga players
Eliteserien players
Germany under-21 international footballers